Obstruction  may refer to:

Places
 Obstruction Island, in Washington state
 Obstruction Islands, east of New Guinea

Medicine
 Obstructive jaundice
 Obstructive sleep apnea
 Airway obstruction, a respiratory problem
 Recurrent airway obstruction
 Bowel obstruction, a blockage of the intestines.
 Gastric outlet obstruction
 Distal intestinal obstruction syndrome
 Congenital lacrimal duct obstruction
 Bladder outlet obstruction

Politics and law
 Obstruction of justice, the crime of interfering with law enforcement
 Obstructionism, the practice of deliberately delaying or preventing a process or change, especially in politics
 Emergency Workers (Obstruction) Act 2006

Science and mathematics
 Obstruction set in forbidden graph characterizations, in the study of graph minors in graph theory
 Obstruction theory, in mathematics
 Propagation path obstruction
 Single Vegetative Obstruction Model

Sports
 Obstruction (baseball), when a fielder illegally hinders a baserunner
 Obstructing the field

See also
 The Five Obstructions, a 2003 film
 USS Obstructor, an American minelayer ship used in World War II